Things Will Matter is the second studio album by English alternative rock band, Lonely The Brave. The album was released through Hassle Records and distributed through RCA Records on 20 May 2016.

Background 
Lonely the Brave first announced the album in February 2016, about three months prior to its release. The album was recorded in late 2015.

Musical style, writing, composition 

The band described the album as "doing something different with most bands", as far as band collaboration was concerned. The described themselves as minimally stressed while putting together the album.

Touring 
Lonely the Brave embarked on a two legged tour in late 2016 and early 2017 with Tall Ships in 2016 and Mallory Knox in 2017 to promote the album.

Critical reception 

Things Will Matter has received critical acclaim. According to Metacritic, the album has an average score of 81, based on five reviews. The consensus of critics was that the album contained epic themes, and powerful instrumentation. David McLaughlin of Rock Sound gave the album four out of five stars commenting that Lonely the Brave "pulled another rabbit from the hat." In a positive review, the Kerrang! staff described the album "continues to make bold strides into the unknown." The staff also gave the album four stars out of five.

Track listing

Charts

References 

2016 albums
Hassle Records albums
Lonely the Brave albums